Senator Barton may refer to:

Charles K. Barton (1886–1958), New Jersey Senate
David Barton (politician) (1783–1837), U.S. Senator from Missouri from  1821 to 1831
William T. Barton (born 1933), Utah State Senate